The Men's skeet event at the 2020 Summer Olympics took place on 25 and 26 July 2021 at the Asaka Shooting Range. After a disappointing showing in Rio, 2008 and 2012 champion Vincent Hancock of the United States rebounded to reclaim the gold medal, thus setting an Olympic record by becoming the first to win three gold medals in this event. Jesper Hansen, after getting to the finals through three shoot-off rounds, won silver, the first Olympic medal in his career. The bronze was awarded to Abdullah Al-Rashidi, who was also the 2016 bronze medalist in skeet. The defending champion Gabriele Rossetti entered the competition but did not qualify for the finals.

Records
Prior to this competition, the existing world and Olympic records were as follows.

During the competition, Eric Delaunay and Tammaro Cassandro set the Olympic record in the qualification (124), whereas Vincent Hancock set the Olympic record in the finals (59).

Schedule

All times are Japan Standard Time (UTC+9)

Results

Qualification

Final

References

Shooting at the 2020 Summer Olympics
Men's events at the 2020 Summer Olympics